Albany United FC is a semi-professional association football club in Albany, New Zealand. They currently compete in the NRFL Conference, having been relegated from the NRFL Division 1 in 2022.

Established in 1977, Albany United Football Club is one of the largest sports clubs in the Albany Community.

External links

The Ultimate New Zealand Soccer website

Association football clubs in Auckland
1977 establishments in New Zealand
Association football clubs established in 1977